The Toronto Paramedic Association (TPA) was founded in 1992 to be a glee club and represent the interests of paramedics employed by Toronto Paramedic Services (TPS). During initial stages of development, membership consisted largely of Advanced Care Practitioners. Over time the TPA has grown to include membership from all practitioner levels within TEMS.

The Toronto Paramedic Association is a part of the Ontario Paramedic Association (OPA). The OPA has 2,800 members and is a part of the Paramedic Association of Canada, which has over 14,000 members. The Toronto Paramedic Association is not a labor representative. The labor interests of members are represented by CUPE Local 416.

References

External links
Toronto Paramedic Association

Organizations based in Toronto
Emergency medical services in Canada